Casminola is a genus of moths in the family Nolidae.

Species
 Casminola arminbecheri László, G. Ronkay & Witt, 2010
 Casminola breviharpe László, G. Ronkay & Witt, 2010
 Casminola chionobasis (Hampson, 1901)
 Casminola johannstumpfi László, G. Ronkay & Witt, 2010
 Casminola pulchella (Leech, 1889)
 Casminola rubropicta László, G. Ronkay & Witt, 2010
 Casminola seminigra (Hampson, 1896)
 Casminola spinosa László, G. Ronkay & Witt, 2010
 Casminola splendida László, G. Ronkay & Witt, 2010
 Casminola subseminigra Y.Q. Hu, H.L. Han & M. Wang, 2013
 Casminola yoshimotoi (Inoue, 2000)

References

 , 2013: A New Species of the Genus Casminola (Lepidoptera: Noctuidae: Nolinae) from China. Florida Entomologist 96 (1): 64-65. Full article: .
 , 2000: Two new species of the Nolinae (Noctuidae) from Taiwan. Transactions of the Lepidopterological Society of Japan 51(4): 251-254. Abstract and full article: .
 , 2010: Contribution to the Nolinae (Lepidoptera, Noctuidae) fauna of North Thailand. Esperiana Buchreihe zur Entomologie 15: 7-126.

External links
Natural History Museum Lepidoptera generic names catalog

Nolinae